Speed is a 1983 Soviet drama film directed by Dmitry Svetozarov.

Plot 
Unknown Grigory Yakovlev suddenly overtook top racers in racing car competitions and as a result was invited to the laboratory of the head of the design bureau.

Cast 
 Aleksey Batalov as Igor Vladimirovich Lagutin
 Dmitriy Kharatyan as Grigory Yakovlev
 Merle Talvik as Krista Tammet
 Vsevolod Shilovskiy as Sergey Trofimovich Levko
 Angelina Stepanova as Elizaveta Alekseyevna
 Baadur Tsuladze as Guram
 Yevgeniya Polyakova
 Olga Vikladt
 Gennadiy Bogachyov
 Viktor Mikhaylov

References

External links 
 

1983 films
1980s Russian-language films
Soviet drama films
1983 drama films